Filippo Tesauro  (1260–1320) was an Italian painter of the Renaissance period, active mainly in Naples. He was the pupil of the painter Tommaso de Stefani the elder. In Naples, he painted the Life of St. Niccolo Eremita in Santa Restituta.

Sources

Hobbes JR. 435

1260 births
1320 deaths
Trecento painters
13th-century Italian painters
Italian male painters
Gothic painters
Painters from Naples